Waco O'Guin (born June 24, 1975) is an American comedian, actor, voice actor, animator, writer, and producer. He is the co-creator, executive producer, and a cast member of the Comedy Central animated series Brickleberry along with fellow writer Roger Black. O'Guin and Black were inspired to create Brickleberry by O'Guin's father-in-law, a former park ranger named Woody. The two later created the 2018 series Paradise PD and the 2022 sci-fi series Farzar.

O'Guin also co-created and starred in MTV2's clown based prank show Stankervision, the underground sketch comedy series The DAMN! Show and a series on Turner's now defunct comedy site, Super Deluxe.

O'Guin is originally from the small town of Lakeland, Georgia and won a national Homer Simpson drawing contest as a youth.

Voice-over filmography

References

External links

1975 births
American male comedians
21st-century American comedians
American male voice actors
Writers from Georgia (U.S. state)
Male actors from Georgia (U.S. state)
Living people
American male writers
People from Lanier County, Georgia